The Charleville Courier was a newspaper published in Charleville, Queensland between 1895 and 1903.

History
The Charleville Courier was printed and published by J. Macnamara and was first published in October 1895.  Each issue was accompanied by supplements.

Digitisation 
The paper has been digitised as part of the Australian Newspapers Digitisation Program  of the National Library of Australia.

See also
 List of newspapers in Australia

References

External links
 

Charleville Courier
Charleville, Queensland